Yvonne Davis is a Democratic member of the Texas House of Representatives, representing the 111th District since 1992.

Birth
Davis was born on February 4, 1955, in Dallas, Texas.

Education
Davis received her BS at the University of Houston.

Professional experience
Yvonne Davis has been a small business owner.

Political experience
Davis has been a member of the Texas State House of Representatives since 1992. Rep. Davis currently services on the Transportation Committee as well as Judiciary and Civil Jurisprudence where she serves as vice-chair.

Current committee assignments

Transportation
Judiciary and Civil Jurisprudence

External links
Texas House of Representatives - Yvonne Davis official TX House website
Project Vote Smart - Representative Yvonne Davis (TX) profile
Follow the Money - Yvonne Davis
2006 2004 2002 2000 1998 campaign contributions

References

Democratic Party members of the Texas House of Representatives
1955 births
Living people
Women state legislators in Texas
Politicians from Dallas
21st-century American politicians
21st-century American women politicians